Mietoinen is a former municipality of Finland. It was joined to the municipality of Mynämäki in the beginning of the year 2007.

Mietoinen is located in the province of Western Finland and is part of the Southwest Finland region.

The municipality was unilingually Finnish.

References

External links

Mietoinen – village portal 
Municipality of Mynämäki – official site 

Former municipalities of Finland
Populated places disestablished in 2007